Eka Mamaladze (Ge. ეკა მამალაძე, born 27 March 1960 in Tbilisi) is a Georgian singer and pianist. She performs Georgian and Russian romances – both in a duet with her mother Nani Bregvadze, with daughter Natalia Kutateladze, and solo.

References 

21st-century women singers from Georgia (country)
Musicians from Tbilisi
1960 births
Living people
20th-century women singers from Georgia (country)